Kjær & Richter is a Danish architectural practice founded in 1967 by Werner Kjær (1924–1998) and Johan Richter (1925–1998). The company is an extension of the practice Richter & Gravers established by Johan Richter and Arne Gravers in 1953.

Works 
Kjær & Richter has designed many celebrated buildings across Denmark. A selection of the most notable comprise the following:

Aarhus
 1959: Århus Statsgymnasium
 1973: Danish School of Journalism
 1982: Aarhus Concert Hall
 1991: Storcenter Nord
 1992: Business Academy Aarhus, Department in Vejlby, Aarhus
 1997: Aarhus School of Architecture, extension
 2014: Navitas Park, education centre at Aarhus Docklands

Grenå
 1972: Grenaa Gymnasium
 1992: Kattegatcentret

Vejle
 1992: Vejle Musikteater
 2004: Hotel Jacob Gade

Other places
 1980: Frederiksværk Gymnasium
 1989: Næstved Storcenter, Næstved
 1993: Kolding Storcenter, Kolding
 1997: Kulturhuset, Skanderborg
 2001: Vestsjællands Kunstmuseum, Sorø
 2008: University College Vest, Esbjerg
 2014: PLAZA Design, Aalborg (in collaboration with Kim Utzon)

References

External links 

 

Architecture firms of Denmark
Companies based in Aarhus
Danish companies established in 1967
Design companies established in 1967